The Tick is a superhero created by cartoonist Ben Edlund in 1986 as a newsletter mascot for the New England Comics chain of Boston-area comic book stores. The character is a parody of American comic book superheroes.

After its creation, the character spun off into an independent comic book series in 1988, and gained mainstream popularity through an animated TV series on Fox in 1994. Two live-action TV series, a video game and various merchandise have also been based on the character. IGN's list of the Top 100 Comic Book Heroes of All Time ranked the Tick as No. 57.

History
In 1986, eighteen-year-old cartoonist Ben Edlund created the Tick as a mascot for a newsletter of the Brockton, Massachusetts, store New England Comics, where he was a frequent customer. Edlund expanded this into stories, beginning with the three-page tale "The Tick" in New England Comics Newsletter #14–15 (July-August – September-October 1986), in which the hero escapes from a mental institution. The character became popular and the store financed a black-and-white comic book series, with the first issue released in June, 1988, and subsequently reprinted at least nine times through the next decade, including later editions with additional content. The Tick's sidekick, Arthur, was introduced in The Tick #4 (April 1989).

Spin-offs followed featuring characters such as Paul the Samurai, Man-Eating Cow, and Chainsaw Vigilante. Edlund continued to write and illustrate these projects initially through his years as an undergraduate film student at the Massachusetts College of Art. The Chainsaw Vigilante spin-off, which was never completed, was written and illustrated by Zander Cannon. Other series, such as the second Paul the Samurai series and the Man-Eating Cow series, were written by writer Clay Griffith.

In 1994, the Fox network introduced The Tick as a Saturday-morning cartoon series, which Edlund wrote and co-produced. Lasting three seasons, the animated series provided the Tick's greatest mainstream fame. Townsend Coleman voiced the title character and Micky Dolenz played his sidekick Arthur, in season 1. Rob Paulsen took over the Arthur role during seasons 2 and 3. Due to issues relating to Standards and Practices, Edlund was not allowed to feature the comic series supporting cast characters in the cartoon due to characters such as Chainsaw Vigilante and Paul the Samurai were deemed inappropriate for a childrens television show. As such, new supporting cast characters such as Die Fledermaus (a Batman parody), American Maid (a Wonder Woman parody), and Sewer Urchin (a parody of Dustin Hoffman's character from Rain Man) were created instead. Sadly, Edlund did not secure ownership rights to said characters and as such, are owned by the animated studio Saban, who made the series and are exclusive to the Animated series continuity. Reruns on Comedy Central helped make the series a cult hit with adults. The 1997 book The Tick: Mighty Blue Justice! by Greg Hyland (creator of Lethargic Lad) was published as a tie-in with the animated series.

In 2001, Fox introduced a live-action TV series (produced by Columbia TriStar Television), written and executive produced by Edlund. The series starred Patrick Warburton as the Tick and David Burke as Arthur. Due to rights issues, original characters from the Fox cartoon series could not appear in the live action series; forcing Edlund to create expies: Nestor Carbonell as Batmanuel (a stand-in for Die Fledermaus)and Liz Vassey as Captain Liberty (a stand-in for American Maid). The series was short-lived, however, and it only lasted nine episodes. A DVD release of the complete series (including several unaired episodes) was released on September 30, 2003.
In June 2005, the Toon Disney network began airing The Tick animated series. The series also occasionally aired on ABC Family as part of the Jetix cartoon block. The following year, Buena Vista Home Entertainment released the first season of The Tick animated series on DVD. The second season was released on August 7, 2007; however, both collections were missing an episode for different reasons.

In July 2016, Amazon announced that a new live-action series, starring Peter Serafinowicz and directed by Wally Pfister, would air on Amazon Video. The pilot was picked up as a series, and the first season's 12 episodes were released in two parts—the first six episodes on August 25, 2017, and the second half on February 23, 2018. A 10-episode second season was released on April 5, 2019.

Character biography

The Tick seems to have no memory of his life before being the Tick, and indeed not much memory of anything; more than likely, this is due to frequent head injuries. Each media adaptation has a different origin of the Tick:
 In the original comic series, the Tick is apparently legally insane, having escaped from a mental institution near the City.
 In the 1994 animated series, he was assigned to protect the City after passing an official superhero initiation test.
 In the 2001 live-action series, the Tick was tricked into moving to (and protecting) the City after irritating the employees of a remote bus station he had sworn to protect. He has no memory of his life before that, although Batmanuel suggests that the Tick may be from space.
 In the 2016 live-action series, the Tick has no memory of where he comes from, and his past was not explained or uncovered. It is implied he is a projection or guardian of some kind of his sidekick, Arthur.

A square-jawed, muscular, bright blue-costumed figure with antennae sticking up from his head, the Tick is a surrealistic parody of superheroes, in the vein of Dave Sim's character Cerebus the Aardvark. He is well-intended, friendly, childlike, good-natured, high-spirited, bombastic, frequently obtuse, and prone to quipping odd, dim remarks and "inspirational" speeches filled with bizarre metaphors. The Tick is known for his nonsensical battle cry, "Spoooooon!", which he decided upon one day while eating a bowl of Drama Flakes cereal.  Warburton described his perception of the Tick character, as Warburton played him:

Originally, the Tick's costume was meant to be brown, but it was decided that blue looked better in print. In The Tick vs. The Tick, wherein the Tick is confronted by Barry, an unstable pseudo-hero who also calls himself "the Tick", Barry wears a brown costume similar to the Tick's. The Tick is named after an arachnid, much like Spider-Man. The logo of the series also resembles that of the 1994 Spider-Man series. According to the live-action series, the Tick is 6 feet 6 inches tall, weighs 230 pounds (6 inches and 170 pounds less than his dimensions in the comic), and has blue hair and eyes.

In the comic series, the Tick gets a job at the Weekly World Planet newspaper. He works in the same office as Clark Oppenheimer, who is also a superhero called the Caped Wonder. Oppenheimer has all the typical Superman powers, including X-ray vision ("see-through vision"), super strength, invulnerability, flight, heat-vision ("very hot vision"), and super hearing. Consequently, he looks down on the Tick as a lower form of superhero with limited powers.

Like many superheroes, the Tick has a sidekick, a rather plump former accountant named Arthur. Arthur wears a white moth suit that allows him to fly; however, he is often mistaken for a bunny due to the long ear-like antennae of his costume and the fact that his wings are often folded up. The Tick is impulsive and Arthur serves as a sort of conscience. He also figures out the schemes of villains and formulates plans to stop them. Arthur's "battle cry" is "Not in the face! Not in the face!"

In the Amazon Prime video series, the Tick is fixated on Arthur, and even mentions at one point that his thinking is fuzzy when away from Arthur. Despite Arthur's repeated attempts to push the Tick away, the hero won't leave Arthur's side for long. The Tick also frequently talks about Destiny as if she is a literal person, guiding Arthur's path ("Destiny gave him the suit. I just acted in more of a 'delivery man' role"), alluding to the Parcae in Roman mythology. At one point, Arthur starts to believe that the Tick is merely a hallucination, but that thought is quickly dispelled when Arthur's sister, Dot, interacts with "The Blue Guy".

In all of his incarnations, the Tick is surrounded by a cast of equally absurd heroes and villains, many of them parodies of popular comic book characters and character types. Few of the "superheroes" in the Tick mythos have powers that measure up to those of DC Comics or Marvel Comics characters, but their foes are often equally silly and/or weak. The Tick lives in a city simply called "The City". In the animated series, the Tick was assigned to the City after his "Cabinet of Terror" (described by the Tick as the "deadliest engine of destruction 1974 had to offer") exploded, leaving him unharmed, during his city assignment selection trials at the National Super Institute Convention in Reno, Nevada. According to the series' companion book, The Tick: Mighty Blue Justice!, at least one of the judges was amazed by this, awarding the Tick a score of 10 out of 10.

Powers and abilities
The Tick possesses superhuman strength and mass, which makes him capable of inflicting great damage on his surroundings if he is not careful. His full strength is never actually quantified, although he is capable of lifting whole cars with a single hand, and comfortably bending steel girders. In the pilot of the 2016 series, The Tick claims to have the strength of "ten, perhaps twenty men—a crowded bus stop of men".

The Tick is also "nigh-invulnerable", which means it is almost impossible to injure him in any serious way (although he is vulnerable to feelings of pain and his antennae are particularly sensitive). Because of this he can survive moments of extreme stress, and has demonstrated this ability on numerous occasions. In one noteworthy instance, in the animated episode "Evil Sits Down for a Moment", he falls 4,000 feet out of the sky, crashing through the concrete road below into a subway tunnel, yet before he reaches a stop he is subsequently hit by an oncoming train: he survives it all without any lasting physical injury (only a brief, albeit severe, concussion). Several powerful supervillains have been able to knock the Tick unconscious in several fights, but he never comes to any lasting harm. He also does not possess a super-powered immune system, as he has been seen sick with the common cold just like a normal person. One of the Tick's few limitations is that harming or removing his antennae will destroy his sense of balance.

Finally, the Tick possesses something referred to as "drama power", or basically a tendency for the Tick's powers to increase as the situation becomes more dramatic. He can also survive in space without a suit, and under water without oxygen for "at least" a long time.

In the 2017 Amazon adaption, he is shown to be able to leap and bound great heights with ease and speed, and he is utterly impervious to bullets.

Reception
The Tick has been well received as a comic book character. Empire magazine ranked him as the 28th-greatest comic book character of all time, stating that the Tick is a lovable lunk, given to overly dramatic declarations on behalf of justice. IGN ranked him as the 57th-greatest comic book hero of all time, saying that if you like your heroes on the bizarre side, you won't find anyone more surreal than the Tick. IGN also stated that whatever his mental state, the Tick's adventures are thoroughly enjoyable on both the printed page and television. Wizard magazine rated him as the 187th-greatest comic book character of all time.

In other media

Television
The Tick (1994 TV series), a 1994–1997 Fox animated television series, with Townsend Coleman voicing the Tick
The Tick (2001 TV series), a 2001–2002 live-action television series, with Patrick Warburton as the Tick
The Tick (2016 TV series), a 2016–2019 live-action Amazon Prime television series, with Peter Serafinowicz as the Tick. Patrick Warburton was involved in the production of the series.

Merchandising

While The Tick comic book series included some extras, such as trading cards, the merchandising of The Tick increased dramatically with the launch of the animated series. Action figures, stickers, pogs, T-shirts, hats, party favors, costumes, and a board game were created. In addition, many fast food restaurant chains, such as Carl's Jr. and Taco Bell offered Tick-related giveaways.

In 1994, Fox Interactive also released a beat 'em up video game based on the animated series. The game, however, was not well received.

References

Bibliography

External links

The Tick (1994–1997) – Official site
Comic Vine
Michael Legg: Leggman's the Tick Super Fanpage!
The Tick - Compendium of Comics

 
Comics characters introduced in 1986
American superheroes
American comics characters
Comics adapted into animated series
Comics adapted into television series
Comics adapted into video games
Comics characters with superhuman strength
Fictional characters with superhuman durability or invulnerability
Humor comics
Parody superheroes
Parody comics
Mascots introduced in 1986
Male characters in comics
Male characters in advertising